Willie Morganson (born  11 September 1972) is an Australian former professional rugby league footballer who played in the 1990s.

Playing career
An North Queensland junior of Indigenous descent, Morganson represented the Queensland under-17 side in 1989 and the Queensland under-19 side in 1990.

In Round 3 of the 1991 NSWRL season, Morganson made his first grade debut for the Brisbane Broncos in a 26–12 win over the Canberra Raiders. He played eighteen first grade matches for the Broncos over three seasons. He scored his first try in Round 20 of the 1991 season, scoring a double in a 44–6 win over the North Sydney Bears. Over the next two seasons, Morganson played just 10 games. 

In 1995, after not appearing in first grade for the Broncos in 1994, Morganson joined the newly established North Queensland Cowboys, starting at centre in their inaugural match against the Sydney Bulldogs. In two seasons with the Cowboys, he played 12 games, scoring four tries.

In 1996, Morganson moved to England, joining the Sheffield Eagles. He played two seasons with the club before returning to Australia. 

In 2001, 2003 and 2005, he represented the Queensland Police in their annual clash with the New South Wales.

Statistics

NSWRL/ARL

Super League

References

1972 births
Living people
Australian police officers
Australian rugby league players
Indigenous Australian rugby league players
Brisbane Broncos players
North Queensland Cowboys players
Sheffield Eagles players
Rugby league centres
Place of birth missing (living people)